One third of Brentwood Borough Council in Essex, England is elected each year, followed by one year where there is an election to Essex County Council. Since the last boundary changes in 2002, 37 councillors have been elected from 15 wards.

Political control
Since the first election to the council in 1973 political control of the council has been held by the following parties:

Leadership
The leaders of the council since 1991 have been:

Council elections
1973 Brentwood District Council election
1976 Brentwood District Council election (New ward boundaries)
1979 Brentwood District Council election
1980 Brentwood District Council election
1982 Brentwood District Council election
1983 Brentwood District Council election
1984 Brentwood District Council election
1986 Brentwood District Council election
1987 Brentwood District Council election (District boundary changes took place but the number of seats remained the same)
1988 Brentwood District Council election
1990 Brentwood District Council election
1991 Brentwood District Council election
1992 Brentwood District Council election
1994 Brentwood Borough Council election (Borough boundary changes took place but the number of seats remained the same)
1995 Brentwood Borough Council election
1996 Brentwood Borough Council election
1998 Brentwood Borough Council election
1999 Brentwood Borough Council election
2000 Brentwood Borough Council election
2002 Brentwood Borough Council election (New ward boundaries)
2003 Brentwood Borough Council election
2004 Brentwood Borough Council election
2006 Brentwood Borough Council election
2007 Brentwood Borough Council election
2008 Brentwood Borough Council election
2010 Brentwood Borough Council election
2011 Brentwood Borough Council election
2012 Brentwood Borough Council election
2014 Brentwood Borough Council election
2015 Brentwood Borough Council election
2016 Brentwood Borough Council election
2018 Brentwood Borough Council election
2019 Brentwood Borough Council election
2021 Brentwood Borough Council election

By-election results

References

 By-election results

External links
 Brentwood Borough Council

 
Borough of Brentwood
Council elections in Essex
District council elections in England